Anthony "Tony" Brennan (born 1944) is an Irish former Gaelic football selector and former player. His league and championship career with the senior Meath county team spanned nine seasons from 1965 until 1973.

Brennan first came to prominence on the inter-county scene as a member of the Meath junior team. He impressed in a number of challenge games and made his senior championship debut during the 1965 championship. Over the course of the next nine seasons, Brennan won one All-Ireland medal in 1967, as well as three Leinster medals. He played his last game for Meath in July 1973. 

In retirement from playing, Brennan became involved in team management. He served as a selector with the Meath senior team under the management of Seán Boylan and helped steer the team to two All-Ireland titles, five Leinster titles and two National Football League titles in a six-year period.

Career statistics

Honours

Player

 Enfield
 Meath Junior Football Championship (1): 1964

 Meath
 All-Ireland Senior Football Championship (1): 1967
 Leinster Senior Football Championship (3): 1966, 1967, 1970

Selector

 Meath
 All-Ireland Senior Football Championship (2): 1987, 1988
 Leinster Senior Football Championship (5): 1986, 1987, 1988, 1990, 1991
 National Football League (2): 1987-88, 1989-90

References

1944 births
Living people
Gaelic football selectors
Meath inter-county Gaelic footballers